Urla may refer to:

 Urla, İzmir, a district of Izmir Province, Turkey
 Urla, Raipur, a town in Chhattisgarh, India